Nick Zedd ( James Franklyn Harding III; January 25, 1956 – February 27, 2022) was an American filmmaker, author, and painter based in Mexico City. He coined the term Cinema of Transgression in 1985 to describe a loose-knit group of like-minded filmmakers and artists using shock value and black humor in their work. These filmmakers and artistic collaborators included Richard Kern, Tessa Hughes Freeland, Lung Leg, Kembra Pfahler, and Lydia Lunch. Under numerous pen names, Zedd edited and wrote the Underground Film Bulletin (1984–1990) which publicized the work of these filmmakers. The Cinema of Transgression was explored in Jack Sargeant's book Deathtripping.

Early life
Zedd was born in Takoma Park, Maryland, on January 25, 1956. Zedd moved to New York in 1976 to study at Brooklyn's Pratt Institute and the School of Visual Arts.

Career 
Zedd directed several super-low-budget feature-length movies, including They Eat Scum, Geek Maggot Bingo, War Is Menstrual Envy and numerous short films. With Jen Miller, he was a co-creator of the public access series Electra Elf (2004-08), featuring New York artists and performers including Miller, Faceboy and Andrew J. Lederer. He served as director of photography on another TV series called Chop Chop (2007), produced by Nate Hill.

Additionally, Zedd acted in such low-budget movies as the Super 8 film The Manhattan Love Suicides (1985), What About Me (1993), Bubblegum (1995), Jonas in the Desert (1997), Terror Firmer (1999), and Thus Spake Zarathustra (2001). He also appeared in the documentaries Llik Your Idols (2007) and Blank City (2010).

Zedd is the author of two autobiographical books, Bleed: Part One (1992) and Totem of the Depraved (1997), as well as the self-published novel From Entropy to Ecstasy (1996). He also contributed to the anthologies Up Is Up But So Is Down, Captured and Low Rent. In the 1980s Zedd published ten issues of the Underground Film Bulletin, a zine intended to promote the Cinema of Transgression. Issue 4 contained the Cinema of Transgression Manifesto, which was also published in The Theory of Xenomorphosis (1998).

In the early 1990s, Zedd toured with Lisa Crystal Carver's Suckdog Circus, exhibiting his films. Performing with experimental noise music band Zyklon Beatles, Zedd released the "Consume and Die" 7-inch single on Rubric Records in 2000.

After exhibiting oil paintings in 2010 at the ADA and Pendu galleries, Zedd presented a major retrospective of films, videos, and paintings at the Microscope Gallery in Brooklyn.

In 2012, he attended a retrospective of his films at the eighth Berlin International Directors Lounge and exhibited work at the KW Institute for Contemporary Art in the same city.

In 2013, Zedd published The Extremist Manifesto, an essay denouncing contemporary art and the class structure that promotes it while announcing the emergence of the Extremist Art movement in Mexico City, which sought to subvert the edicts of established art institutions and curatorial ideologues. This manifesto, first released online, then in a self-published Hatred of Capitalism magazine issued in Mexico City (in English and Spanish) was reprinted a year later by the Museo Universitario del Chopo, along with two more issues as part of the Fanzinoteka exhibition. At a screening at the New Museum in New York, Zedd was presented with the Acker Award for Lifetime Achievement, a tribute given to "members of the avant garde arts community who have made outstanding contributions in their discipline in defiance of convention, or else served their fellow writers and artists in outstanding ways".

In 2014, Zedd exhibited three motion pictures at the Museum of Modern Art in New York as part of a posthumous retrospective of films by Christoph Schlingensief, who had cited Zedd as a major influence on his work. Later in 2014, Zedd presented his first public exhibition of paintings in Mexico City, in a group show curated by Aldo Flores at Salon des Aztecas Gallery in Coyoacán. In 2015, Zedd presented his first one-man show of paintings at the V&S Gallery in Mexico City. Zedd also shot an 8mm short entitled Paradise Lost with a borrowed Russian camera for inclusion in a feature-length compilation with contributions from underground filmmakers from many countries. Zedd's movie documents the contents of his apartment and his family in Condesa during a eviction that resulted in the complete destruction of the building's architectural integrity along with the forced exile of all of the tenants.

Personal life and death  
Zedd died from complications from cirrhosis of the liver, cancer, and hepatitis C, in Mexico City, on February 27, 2022, at the age of 63. He was survived by his partner of 15 years, Monica Casanova, as well as two sons and a step-daughter.

Filmography

 They Eat Scum (1979)
 The Bogus Man (1980)
 Geek Maggot Bingo (1983) 
 The Wild World of Lydia Lunch (1983)
 Thrust in Me (1984)
 School of Shame (1984)
 Kiss Me Goodbye (1986)
 Go to Hell (1986)
 Police State (1987)
 Whoregasm (1988)
 War Is Menstrual Envy (1992)
 Smiling Faces Tell Lies (1995)
 Why Do You Exist (1998)
 Tom Thumb in the Land of the Giants (1999)
 Ecstasy in Entropy (1999)
 I of K9 (2001)
 Elf Panties: The Movie (2001)
 Lord of the Cockrings (2001)
 Thus Spake Zarathustra (2001)
 I Was a Quality of Life Violation (2002)
 Electra Elf: Dance With the Devil (2003)
 Electra Elf: Maggot on a Hot Tin Roof (2003)
 Electra Elf: Old Man & the Sea Monkey (2003)
 Electra Elf: Great Shrunken Expectations (2004)
 Electra Elf: Roof Party (2004)
 Electra Elf: I, Nauseous (2004)
 Electra Elf: Hellbound Heiresses (2004)
 Electra Elf: Deadly Little Trees (2005)
 Electra Elf: Triumph of the Ill (2005)
 Electra Elf: Of Lice and Men (2005)
 Electra Elf: The Beginning Parts One & Two (2005)
 Electra Elf: Don't Worry Bee Happy (2006)
 Electra Elf: Vile Buddies (2006)
 Electra Elf: Battle of the Bands (2006)
 Electra Elf: No Plague Like Home (2007)
 Filthy Rich (2007) 
 Electra Elf: We All Scream for Ice Cream (2007)
 Electra Elf: Behind the Scenes (2007)
 Mistakes Hapen (2007)
 Electra Elf: Hollow Be Thy Name (2007)
 Electra Elf: Goin to the Chapel (2007)
 Electra Elf: Gone with the Mind (2008)
 NYC/MEXICO (2011)
 The Birth of Zerak (2011)
 Paintings 2009-11 (2011)
 Frustration/Dr. Shinto (2011)
 Cockfight (2012)
 El Manifiesto Extremista (2013)
 Demonic Sweaters: Love Always Love (2014)
 Paradise Lost (2015)
 The Death of Muffinhead (2016)
 Attack of the Particle Disruptors (2016)
 Demonica (2017)
 Eclipse of the Ectoparasite (2017)
 The Reckoning (2019)

References

External links

 Nick Zedd's homepage
 
 Films from the Cinema of Transgression at UbuWeb
 Interview at Love & Pop (archived at the Wayback Machine)
 Nick Zedd's Extremist Manifesto
 Microscope Gallery: Nick Zedd Films
 Watch Online: Cinema of Transgression
 Nick Zedd Papers at Fales Library and Special Collections at New York University

1956 births
2022 deaths
20th-century American male writers
21st-century American male writers
American expatriates in Mexico
American experimental filmmakers
American memoirists
Deaths from cancer in Mexico
Deaths from hepatitis
Deaths from liver cancer
Deaths from cirrhosis
Film directors from Maryland
Film theorists
People from Takoma Park, Maryland
Punk filmmakers
Writers from Baltimore
Writers from Mexico City